Itchy may refer to:

Entertainment

Characters
 A fictional animated mouse in The Itchy & Scratchy Show, the show-within-a-show on The Simpsons
 Attichitcuk, Chewbacca's father in 1978's The Star Wars Holiday Special, nicknamed "Itchy"
 A villain from the Dick Tracy comic strip
 Itchy Itchiford, a character from All Dogs Go to Heaven
 A character in the 1952 musical Wish You Were Here

Other entertainment
 Itchy (band), a German punk rock band
 "Itchy", an episode of the television series Zoboomafoo

Other uses
 The feeling of an itch
 ITCHY, a technique used in protein engineering

See also
 Itch (disambiguation)